Life is a Church is a studio album from Christian singer David Phelps. It was released on September 13, 2005 by Word Records.

Track listing 

"With His Love (Sing Holy)" (John Bryant Cox) - 3:44
"Something's Gotta Change" (Greg Bieck, Tyler Hayes-Bieck, David Phelps) - 3:37
"Life Is a Church" (Marcus Hummon) - 4:56
"That's What Love Is" (Bieck, Hayes-Bieck, Phelps) - 5:19
"Behold the Lamb" (Dottie Rambo) - 5:04
"Long Time Coming" (Bieck, Jason Houser, Matthew West) - 3:43
"Gentle Savior" (Bieck, Kyle Matthews, Phelps) - 4:40
"Visions of God" (Phelps) - 4:38
"Power" (Bieck, Matthews, Phelps) - 3:19
"The Name Lives On" (Matthews, Phelps) - 4:25
"Legacy of Love" (Cindy Morgan, Phelps) - 3:53

Personnel 
 David Phelps – vocals 
 Greg Bieck – acoustic piano, keyboards, synthesizers, programming, arrangements, string arrangements 
 T-Bone Wolk – accordion, guitars, bass 
 Rob Hawkins – guitars 
 David May – guitars 
 Will Owsley – guitars 
 Mike Payne – guitars 
 Mark Hill – bass 
 Dan Needham – drums 
 Ken Lewis – drums, percussion 
 Ben Phillips – drums 
 John Catchings – cello, string arrangements
 David Davidson – viola, violin, string arrangements
 Luke Brown – backing vocals 
 Nirva Dorsaint – backing vocals 
 Brandon Fraley – backing vocals 
 Sherri Proctor – backing vocals 
 Chance Scoggins – backing vocals 
 Michelle Swift – backing vocals

Production 
 Tim Marshall – executive producer 
 Otto Price – executive producer 
 Greg Bieck – producer, engineer 
 Steve Bishir – engineer 
 Bill Whittington – engineer, Pro Tools
 Aaron Sternke – assistant engineer 
 Danny Duncan – drum engineer 
 David Leonard – mixing 
 Marcelo Pennell – mixing 
 Lee Bridges – mix assistant 
 Josh Baldwin – digital editing 
 Andrew Mendelson – mastering at Georgetown Masters (Nashville, Tennessee)
 Cheryl H. McTyre – A&R production 
 Blair Berle – creative director 
 Katherine Petillo – art direction 
 Jay Smith – art direction, design
 Ben Pearson – photography 
 Kim Perrett – wardrobe 
 Lori Turk – grooming

Awards

The album was nominated for a Dove Award for Inspirational Album of the Year at the 37th GMA Dove Awards.

Chart performance

The album peaked at #11 on Billboard's Christian Albums and #9 on Heatseekers.

References

External links
Life is a Church on Amazon.com

2005 albums
David Phelps albums